James T. Meeks (born August 4, 1956) is a Baptist minister and past member of the Illinois Senate, who represented the 15th district from 2003 to 2013. While a Senator, he chaired the Illinois Legislative Black Caucus. He briefly campaigned for Mayor of Chicago in the 2003 and 2011 election, before dropping out of the race both times. He subsequently become a leading figure in the campaign to prevent same-sex marriage in Illinois.

Meeks was appointed chair of the Illinois State Board of Education by Governor Bruce Rauner and took office January 21, 2017. He succeeded Gery Chico who had resigned the previous week.

Early life
James T. Meeks was born August 4, 1956 to parents who came to Chicago as part of the Great Migration. Meeks was raised in Englewood, near West 64th Street and South Laflin Street. After graduating from Harper High School, Meeks continued his education at Bishop College in Dallas, where he earned a degree in Religion and Philosophy.

Ministry
In 1980, he became pastor of Beth Eden Baptist Church in Chicago.  In 1985, Meeks, still pastor of Beth Eden Baptist Church, shared the vision of founding a new church in a sermon. After a meeting with 205 members that same day, he founded 
the Salem Baptist Church.

The new congregation held its first services January 20, 1985 at 8201 South Jeffrey Boulevard and remained at this location for five-years. In 2005, he inaugurated the House of Hope, a 10,000-seat facility.  The venue has  of usable space.

In 2023, he stepped down as senior pastor. In his post-minister life, he has become a non-profit, affordable housing developer in Kensington.

Political career 
In 2002, Meeks became the first state senator to be elected as an independent. He won re-election in 2006 as a Democrat. In November 2011, he announced that he would not seek reelection when his current term ended in January 2013.

In 1998, Meeks led a movement to "dry up" Roseland Community by collecting votes to close 26 liquor stores. He also created a mentoring program called "It Takes a Village
" which provides support and assistance to pregnant youth and young mothers.

Meeks was also concerned with issues of housing affordability. He sponsored a bill which would make permanent a 2003 Executive Order that established a task force to develop Annual Comprehensive Housing Plans to address critical housing issues. The bill focuses its attention on vulnerable groups, including those at risk of homelessness and low income people with disabilities.

Another bill sponsored by Meeks addressed law enforcement and racial profiling. The bill would allow police departments to apply for grants to purchase cameras for police cars. Meeks believes that cameras in police cars protects everyone involved in a traffic stop, arguing that it provides security for both the driver and the law enforcement officer, and that it may also help reduce instances of racial profiling.

Meeks was the chairperson of the Housing and Community Affairs Committee and Vice Chairperson of the Commerce and Economic Development Committee. Additionally, he was a member of the Senate Commerce; Appropriations I; Education; Higher Education; and Senate Education Funding Reform Committees.

During his speech supporting the removal of Rod Blagojevich from office, Meeks reprised the governor's now-infamous quote about Barack Obama's Senate seat, saying, "We have this thing called impeachment and it's bleeping golden, and we've used it the right way."

Meeks has been a leading and outspoken figure in the 2013 campaign to stop same-sex marriage legalization in Illinois.

Education reform 
In fall 2008, he announced a boycott of the Chicago Public Schools, urging his congregants and people from other churches to keep their children home until Chicago inner-city schools received more funding from Springfield. Meeks pointed out that at New Trier High School in Winnetka, thousands of dollars more are spent on each student, compared to Chicago Public Schools, where the population is mostly minorities from low-income homes. Over a thousand students met outside New Trier High School in the suburban North Shore to protest. The boycott ended after two days when governor Rod Blagojevich said he would not with Meeks during a boycott.

In 2009 and 2010, Meeks worked to pass opportunity scholarships for children in Chicago's worst-performing public schools. This effort was supported by a bipartisan coalition of legislators and outside groups such as the Illinois Policy Institute.

In 2015, he was elected chairman of the Illinois State Board of Education, serving until 2019.

Controversy 
In November 2010, in an interview on the radio station WVON, Meeks advocated that only African Americans should be qualified for city contracts designated for minorities and women. During the conversation, he stated, "The word 'minority' from our standpoint should mean African American. I don't think women, Asians and Hispanics should be able to use that title. That's why our numbers cannot improve — because we use women, Asians and Hispanics who are not people of color, who are not people who have been discriminated against". He later retracted his statement by saying he would only forbid white women if elected mayor. He told television station WFLD, "I don't believe white women should be considered in that count ….You have white women in the category. They receive contracts. Then, white men receive contracts. Where does that leave everybody else"? The next day, Meeks released a written statement further elucidating his comments. It stressed that "all minority- and women-owned businesses" are entitled to their "fair share" of city contracts.

Personal life 
Meeks and his wife Jamell live in Chicago, Illinois and have four children: Jamie, Janet, Trent (Christina), and Jasmine, and one granddaughter and a grandson

References

External links
Illinois General Assembly - Senator James Meeks (D) 15th District official IL Senate website
Bills Committees
Project Vote Smart - Senator James T. Meeks (IL) profile
Follow the Money – James T Meeks
2006 2004 2002 campaign contributions
Illinois State Senate Democrats - Senator James T. Meeks profile
Salem Baptist Church of Chicago

1956 births
Living people
African-American state legislators in Illinois
Baptist ministers from the United States
Bishop College alumni
Illinois Democrats
Illinois Independents
Illinois state senators
Politicians from Chicago
21st-century American politicians
Chairs of the Illinois State Board of Education
21st-century African-American politicians
20th-century African-American people